Lindsey Larson (born ) is a Canadian volleyball player. She is part of the Canada women's national volleyball team.

She participated in the 2015 FIVB Volleyball World Grand Prix.
On club level she has played for University of Texas at El Paso since 2012.

References

1994 births
Living people
Canadian women's volleyball players
Place of birth missing (living people)
UTEP Miners athletes
Setters (volleyball)
Expatriate volleyball players in the United States
Canadian expatriate sportspeople in the United States